Kharabeh may refer to:
 Kharabeh, East Azerbaijan
 Kharabeh, Hormozgan
 Kharabeh, West Azerbaijan
 Kharabeh Amin
 Kharabeh-ye Chul Arkh
 Kharabeh-ye Kachal
 Kharabeh-ye Kohal
 Kharabeh-ye Qaderlu
 Kharabeh-ye Sadat
 Kharabeh-ye Senji
 Qaleh Kharabeh (disambiguation)